Jean Catherine Coulter (born December 26, 1942) is an American author of romantic suspense thrillers and historical romances who currently resides in northern California.

Biography

Early years
Coulter grew up on a horse ranch in Cameron County, Texas. Her grandmother, who died at the young age of 37, was also a writer. Her father was a painter and singer, and her mother is a retired concert pianist. Coulter wrote her first two novels, fifteen pages each, when she was fourteen. While a freshman at the University of Texas, Coulter wrote poetry. After earning her undergraduate degree from the University of Texas, Coulter attended Boston College and earned a master's degree in early 19th-century European history.

She took a job as a speechwriter for a Wall Street executive. As her own husband was then a medical student, she spent many of her evenings alone, reading romance novels. One night when they were home together, she found herself in the middle of a particularly bad book and threw it across room, asserting that even she could do better. Her husband challenged her to prove herself, and the two spent the weekend plotting out a storyline for a gothic romance. She wrote the novel in the evenings.

Writing career
When Coulter finished writing her novel she sent it to an editor at Signet. Three days later Signet offered her a three-book contract. That first novel, The Autumn Countess, was published by Penguin Books in 1978. By 1982, she was earning enough to quit her job and become a full-time writer. Since then she has written over fifty books and has had forty-two consecutive New York Times Bestsellers since 1988. Her thriller The Maze was her first book to place on the New York Times Hardcover Bestseller list, while The Cove spent nine weeks on the New York Times Paperback Bestseller list and sold over one million copies. Coulter generally publishes one historical romance and one suspense novel each year, and has been busily rewriting many of her earlier Regency romances to turn them into longer historical romances.

Personal life
Coulter sits down at her computer every morning at 6:30 a.m. to review her email before beginning writing at 7:30 a.m.  She normally finishes writing by 11 a.m. to 11:30 a.m. Coulter lives in Sausalito, California with her husband.

Bibliography

Regency

Baron series
The Wild Baron (1981/1997)
The Offer (1981/1997)
The Deception (1983/1999)

The Sherbrooke series
The Sherbrooke Bride (1992)
The Hellion Bride (1992)
The Heiress Bride (1993)
Mad Jack (1999)
The Courtship (2000)
The Scottish Bride (2001)
Pendragon (2002)
The Sherbrooke Twins (2004)
Lyon's Gate (2005)
Wizards Daughter (2007)
The Prince of Ravenscar (2011)

Grayson Sherbrooke's Otherworldly Adventures [e-novellas]
The Strange Visitation at Wolffe Hall (2015)
The Resident Evil at Blackthorn Manor (2016)
The Ancient Spirits of Sedgwick House (October 30, 2018)

Night Trilogy
Night Fire (1989)
Night Shadow (1989)
Night Storm (1990)

Legacy series
The Wyndham Legacy (1994)
The Nightingale Legacy (1995)
The Valentine Legacy (1995)

The Magic Trilogy
Midsummer Magic (1987)
Calypso Magic (1988)
Moonspun Magic (1988)

Single novels
 The Countess (1978/1999)
 The Rebel Bride (1997)
 The Heir (1980)
 The Duke (1997)
 Lord Harry (1993/1997)

Georgian
Devil's Embrace Penguin/Signet (re-issued, re-written version 5/2000)
Devil's Daughter Penguin/Signet (re-release 9/12/2000)

Victorian/Early San Francisco
Evening Star Penguin/Topaz (original title Sweet Surrender)
Midnight Star Penguin/Topaz, (reissued 10/96)
Wild Star Penguin/Topaz
Jade Star Penguin/Topaz

Medieval
Warrior's Song (rewritten version of Chandra) Penguin/Signet
Fire Song Penguin/Signet
Earth Song Penguin/Signet
Secret Song Penguin/Signet
Rosehaven Berkley/Jove
The Penwyth Curse (new release Jan. 2003) Berkley/Jove
The Valcourt Heiress Putnam Adult (October 2010)

Viking Era
Season of the Sun Penguin/NAL/Onyx
Lord of Hawkfell Island Berkley/Jove
Lord of Raven's Peak Berkley/Jove
Lord of Falcon Ridge Berkley/Jove

Contemporary romance
Aftershocks Silhouette/Harlequin
Afterglow Silhouette/Harlequin
The Aristocrat Silhouette/Harlequin

Contemporary romantic thrillers
 False Pretenses (1988)
 Impulse (1990)
 Beyond Eden (1992)
 Born to Be Wild (2006)

FBI Thrillers
 
 
 
 
 
 
 
 
 
 
 
 
 
 
 
 
 
 
 
 
 
 
 
 
  [Release Date: August 10, 2021]

Omnibus editions
  (containing The Cove & The Maze)
  (containing The Target & The Edge)
  (containing Riptide & Hemlock Bay)
  (containing Eleventh Hour & Blindside)

A Brit in the FBI
  written with J.T. Ellison
  written with J.T. Ellison
  written with J.T. Ellison
  written with J.T. Ellison
  written with J.T. Ellison
  written with J.T. Ellison [Release Date: March 26, 2019]

References

External links
 
 

1942 births
Living people
American romantic fiction writers
Writers of historical romances
American historical novelists
Morrissey College of Arts & Sciences alumni
University of Texas at Austin alumni
People from Cameron County, Texas
Novelists from Texas
Writers from the San Francisco Bay Area
People from Sausalito, California
American women novelists
Women romantic fiction writers
20th-century American novelists
20th-century American women writers
21st-century American novelists
21st-century American women writers
Women historical novelists
Novelists from California